Gassang Forest Park is a forest park in the Gambia. Established on January 1, 1954, it covers 53 hectares.

The estimate terrain elevation above sea level is 2 metres.

References
  
 

Protected areas established in 1954
Forest parks of the Gambia